Perumpadappu may refer to:

 Perumpadappu, Malappuram, Kerala state, India
 Perumpadappu, Ernakulam, Kerala state, India